Chalinga is a genus of butterflies in the family Nymphalidae.

Species
 Chalinga elwesi (Oberthür, 1883)
 Chalinga pratti (Leech, 1890)
 Chalinga puerensis Tshikolovets, 2017 

Limenitidinae
Nymphalidae genera